The Jabaco Formation is a geologic formation in Cuba. It preserves fossils dating back to the Paleogene period.

Description 
The Jabaco Formation consists of yellowish calcareous marls with abundant calcareous sandstone, in places compacted into marly limestone. The Jicotea Member is correlated with the Avon Park Formation of Florida.

Fossil content 
 Tylocidaris bermudez
 Prionocidaris loveni
 Palmerius roberti
 Prophyllacanthus eocenicus

See also 

 List of fossiliferous stratigraphic units in Cuba

References

Further reading 
 
 B. M. Cutress. 1980. Cretaceous and Tertiary Cidaroida (Echinodermata: Echinoidea) of the Caribbean Area. Bulletins of American Paleontology 77(309):1-221

Geologic formations of Cuba
Paleogene Cuba
Marl formations
Sandstone formations
Limestone formations
Geography of Pinar del Río Province